The Czech Pirate Party leadership election of 2014 was held on 2 August 2014. Lukáš Černohorský was elected new leader of the party.

Background
Party was led by Ivan Bartoš who led the party during 2014 European Parliament election. Party narrowly failed to reach electoral threshold and  Bartoš decided to resign. Party had to face inner conflicts after the election which was another reason of Bartoš' resignation. Lukáš Černohorský, Jakub Michalek and Ivo Vašíček decided to run for the position. Bartoš endorsed Černohorský.

Voting

Three candidates advanced form 1st round of voting. Černohorský received 78 votes, Michálek 55 votes and Vašíček 41 votes.

References

Czech Pirate Party leadership elections
2014 elections in the Czech Republic
Czech Pirate Party leadership election